Castel is a surname. Notable people with the surname include:

 Charles-Irénée Castel de Saint-Pierre (1658–1743), French writer
 Jean-Gabriel Castel (born 1925), Canadian law professor
 Louis Bertrand Castel (1688–1757), French mathematician
 Moshe Castel (1909–1991), Israeli artist
 P. Kevin Castel (born 1950), U.S. District Judge, Southern District of New York
 René Richard Louis Castel (1758–1832), French poet and naturalist
 Robert Castel (1933–2013), French sociologist

See also
 Castel (disambiguation)
 Castle (surname)
 Castillo (surname)